Xiaobiele Lake or Xiaobieletan is an ephemeral lake in the southwestern Qarhan Playa north of Golmud in the Haixi Prefecture of Qinghai Province in northwestern China. Like the other lakes of the surrounding Qaidam Basin, it is extremely saline; like the other lakes of the surrounding Bieletan subbasin, it is rich in lithium.

Names
The xiao at the beginning of the name is the pinyin romanization of the Chinese word meaning "little" or "lesser", distinguishing it from nearby Dabiele Lake ("Big" or "Greater Biele Lake"). Xiaobiele is also known as Xiaobieletan from a Chinese word used for both beaches and muddy riverbanks.

Geography
It lies between Dabiele and West Dabusun Lakes. Its depth usually does not exceed .

Geology
Xiaobiele's position at the south end of the playa means that its waters are relatively less influenced by the concentrated mineral springs along the playa's northern boundary. As with Dabiele, it is nonetheless nearly saturated with calcite, anhydrite, halite, and (importantly) carnallite, which is processed to produce potash for potassium-rich fertilizers and other uses. The lithium derives from hot springs located near Mount Buka Daban which now feed the Narin Gol River or Hongshui River   Hóngshuǐ Hé) that flows into East Taijinar Lake. In the past, however, the springs lay within the "Kunlun" paleolake which until about 30,000 years ago produced a river which flowed north into a broad alluvial fan feeding the "Qarhan" paleolake in the Sanhu area. Bieletan's lithium came both from deposits directly flowing into the area at the time and continuing contributions from the Urt Moron and other rivers arising in and flowing through the former alluvial plain.

See also
 Qarhan Playa & Qaidam Basin
 List of lakes and saltwater lakes of China

References

Citations

Bibliography
 .
 .
 .
 .
 .

Lakes of China
Lakes of Qinghai
Haixi Mongol and Tibetan Autonomous Prefecture